The Princess in a Nightrobe is a 1914 Hungarian film directed by Michael Curtiz.

Plot summary

Cast
 Aranka Molnár as Hercegnõ
 Lajos Ujváry as Német rendõr
 Kálmán Horváth as Kálmán Horváth		
 Vilma Gombócz		
 Károly Árnyay	
 Margit Koppány	
 Dobozi	
 Ferenc Ráskai

References

External links
 

1914 films
Films directed by Michael Curtiz
Hungarian silent films
Hungarian black-and-white films
Austro-Hungarian films